Lloyd Carney (born February 13, 1962) lives in the San Francisco Bay Area. He is formerly the Chief Executive Officer and a member of the board of directors of Brocade Communications Systems leaving that position when Brocade was acquired by Broadcom Limited in 2017.

Biography 
Carney, born in Kingston, Jamaica, where he attended Wolmer's Schools, holds a Bachelor of Science degree in Electrical Engineering Technology from Wentworth Institute of Technology, as well as a Master of Science degree in Applied Business Management from Lesley University in Cambridge, Massachusetts. Carney’s father is from Havana, Cuba, his mother from St. Elizabeth, Jamaica. Carney was the commencement speaker for the Wentworth Institute of Technology's Summer Commencement of 2013, where he was awarded the title of Honorary Doctor of Engineering Technology. Carney has two children and a grandson.

Career 
After graduating from Lesley University, Carney joined Prime Computer and Data General before moving to Proteon and Wellfleet Communications. Synoptics purchased Wellfleet and formed Bay Networks, after which Nortel Networks acquired Bay Networks and placed Carney as president of the Core IP, Wireless Internet and Enterprise Divisions in Paris, France.

In 2002, Carney joined Juniper Networks as the chief operating officer where he oversaw the engineering, product management and manufacturing divisions. In 2003, Carney was appointed chairman and CEO of Micromuse Inc., an enterprise and telecom network management company. Micromuse was acquired in 2006 by International Business Machines Corp (IBM) where Carney then served as the general manager of the Netcool Division.

In 2008, Carney joined Xsigo Systems and served as CEO and member of the board of directors until its acquisition by Oracle Corporation in July 2012.

In January 2013, Carney was named CEO and member of the board of directors of Brocade Communications Systems. Carney is also a member of the board of directors of Technicolor, where he serves as the chairman of the Technology Committee, and is a member of the board of directors of Cypress Semiconductor where he serves as a member of the Audit and Compensation Committees.

On June 11, 2015, Carney was elected to the Board of Directors of Visa Inc. as a new independent director and serve as a member of the Board’s Audit and Risk Committee.

Philanthropy 
Carney is an active contributor to the Silicon Valley Start-up Common (SVSC) which is an ecosystem of entrepreneurs, mentors and investors arranged to help get start-ups off the ground and grow. Carney helps entrepreneurs connect to capital for investment through SVSC.

He also established Carney Global Ventures, LLC, an early round investor focused on proven individuals with creative technology ideas.

References 

American telecommunications industry businesspeople
American technology chief executives
Living people
1962 births
People from Kingston, Jamaica
Wentworth Institute of Technology alumni
Lesley University alumni
American chief operating officers